Kapitan Żbik is a Polish comic book series published in years 1967–1982. Title hero, Jan Żbik is a Milicja Obywatelska captain.

There were 53 comics about Żbik released. A sequel, entitled Komisarz Żbik, was started in 2006. The title hero is police commissioner Michał Maciej Żbik, grandson of Jan Żbik, who is now a retired police colonel.

List of Kapitan Żbik comics

Polish comics titles
1967 comics debuts
1982 comics endings
Educational comics
Crime comics
Zbik
Zbik
Zbik, Captain
Comics set in the 1960s
Comics set in the 1970s
Comics set in the 1980s
Comics set in Poland
Zbik